The Fair Rubber Association, Fair Rubber e.V., is a non-governmental organization registered under German law. Its purpose is to apply the principles of fair trade to products made of natural rubber, in order to help improve the working and living conditions in particular of the primary producers of natural rubber, i.e. the tappers and small farmers involved in the procurement of raw latex milk (raw rubber).

History
The first Fair Trade project for rubber was initiated in 2006 by FairDeal Trading Llp, a small British pioneer in Fairly Traded sports balls, trying to make their products environmentally sustainable, too: With more than 60% of a standard soccer ball consisting of rubber, the search was on to find suppliers willing to become partners in a Fair Trade rubber project. This private deal attracted the attention of a condom manufacturer and a mattress manufacturer in Germany, who put their products under the same Fair Trade conditions. As other companies became interested, in particular a household gloves trader from the US, it was time to set up an independent organization to independently run the Fair Trade project. Hence the Fair Rubber Association was founded on June 21, 2012, and since its founding more traders and NGOs have joined.

Criteria for fairly traded rubber 
The criteria for Fairly Traded natural rubber are closely aligned to the criteria of the FairTrade Labelling Organization (FLO) International for tea.

In India and Sri Lanka, from where the Fairly Traded natural rubber is sourced, tea and rubber plantations often belong to the same owners, and the workers are represented by the same trade unions. Furthermore, it should be mentioned that Martin Kunz, the Executive Secretary of the Fair Rubber Association, during his time as general secretary of TransFair International (TFI) (the precursor to FLO) had a central role in establishing the criteria for Fairtrade-labelled tea. At the centre of this first Fairtrade-labelled product from plantations, was a fixed extra payment per kilogram of produce traded. This Fairtrade premium was and is being paid into a separate bank account with the decision-making power resting with a joint body made up of a committee of elected members of the workforce and management delegates. The Fair Trade premium may only be used for the improvement of the working and living conditions of the plantation employees. In the case of small farmer associations, it is of course the association's board which makes the decisions. The Fair Trade premium paid by the members of the Fair Rubber Association for Fairly Traded rubber is 0.50 EUR per kg of Dry Rubber Content (DRC) on top of the market price of rubber. Products, for which this Fair Trade premium has been paid, can be recognized by the Association's logo

Environmental considerations
In the opinion of the Fair Rubber Association, one key component of Fair Trade is to help in making the environment safer for producers and consumers, by promoting sustainability in products and production: Taking harmful chemicals out of farming is first and foremost of benefit to the primary producers. And on a more global scale: While natural rubber is not suitable for all applications (there are issues with deterioration in sunlight, cold, salt water ...), natural rubber is far superior to synthetic rubbers when it comes to environmental benefits: Synthetic/artificial rubber is a petroleum based product, i.e. made with fossil energy, which contributes to global warming. On the other hand: The trees from which natural rubber is tapped, have such a high leaf density, that they absorb more carbon dioxide than even the tropical rain forest. Martin Kunz: Fair trade latecomer rubber is catching up: Here, too, it's all about price  Alexander Fonari / Vivien Führ / Norbert Stamm (eds.), April 2021.15th Bavarian Round Table: Social and environmental standards at companies.

Organizational structure
The history of the project, and the experience of those that set it up, made it clear that Fair Trade cannot work properly without the expertise and co-operation of traders. Hence the Fair Rubber Association is set up as a multi-stakeholder initiative - where the best possible compromise is sought between social, environmental and commercial interests. However, the chairperson of the association always has to be someone who has no commercial interests in rubber. The Fair Rubber Association: where fairly traded rubber hits the road.

Achievements
Fairly Traded condoms are  one of the first products applying the Fair Trade criteria of the Fair Rubber Association. Other products include: Mattresses, household gloves, flip flops, balloons, hot water bottle, rubber boots, elastic bands, rubber band balls, ... In its founding year and the first full year of its existence, the members of the Fair Rubber Association purchased almost 150 metric tons of natural rubber under the Association's criteria, which means Fair Trade premium payments of almost EUR 75,000. The workers who received this extra money used it, among other projects, to
 Secure safe drinking water (as a result of global warming previously safe water supplies are increasingly drying up).
 Arrange for electricity supply to a remote worker hamlet.
 Pay for a supplementary pension fund for retired plantation workers.
 Provide help for medical and other emergencies.

References

External links 
 
 Plastic Free Living: Where And How To Shop If You Want To Cut Down

Rubber industry